Unisoo is a notifed area and a village in Langate Tehsil of Kupwara District of Jammu and Kashmir, India.

References
Mega Health Mela held at Unisoo, Kupwara
KNS
9 aspirants from J&K qualify UPSC exams
CHC Rajpora Shines : First Time Perform 2 MIPH Surgeries
Jammu and Kashmir: Three suspected militants, civilian killed in encounter in Handwara town
8 months on, Kupwara student still missing

Villages in Kupwara district